Martin Heřman (born 23 June 1987) is a Czech professional ice hockey player. He played with HC Plzeň in the Czech Extraliga during the 2010–11 season.

References

External links

1987 births
Living people
Czech ice hockey forwards
HC Plzeň players
Sportspeople from Plzeň
HC Berounští Medvědi players
Motor České Budějovice players
IHC Písek players
Beibarys Atyrau players
Czech expatriate ice hockey players in Germany
Czech expatriate sportspeople in Kazakhstan
Expatriate ice hockey players in Kazakhstan